James Morehead may refer to:
James Turner Morehead (North Carolina politician) (1799–1875), Congressional Representative from North Carolina
James T. Morehead Jr. (born 1838), his son, congressman, served in the North Carolina Senate
James Turner Morehead (chemist) (1840–1908), chemist who founded what became Union Carbide
James Turner Morehead (Kentucky politician) (1797–1854), senator and governor of Kentucky
James B. Morehead (1916–2012), American fighter pilot of World War II